The Shaghzay ambush was a battle fought between police forces and Taliban militants in Afghanistan on 1 January 2009.

Ambush

On 1 January, an armed group of Taliban fighters ambushed a group of 40 policemen as they were eating lunch in the remote village of Shaghzay. A number of Taliban fighters infiltrated through the village and set up the well planned and coordinated assault on Afghan security forces. An Afghan police officer who survived the attack said it started when militants began shooting at policemen killing many. Policemen then turned their weapons on each other, defecting to the Taliban. The rest of the remaining officers were slaughtered with hails of gunfire then they were beheaded and had their bodies mutilated. Eight Afghan policemen managed to escape to a nearby town. The mother of one of the slain policemen was also killed when she pleaded for her son's live. Residents in the village claimed that the bodies of the policemen were scattered along the road, one said he counted the bodies of two dead Taliban fighters as well. Police reinforcements arrived an hour later and successfully took back Shaghzay, after the Taliban abandoned the town along with several defected police officers. The Taliban claimed it was an insider attack as one former policemen gave them information about the police group and when to ambush them, in return he defected.

References

2009 in Afghanistan
Ambushes
January 2009 events in Asia
History of Helmand Province